Folkestone and Hythe can refer to:
 Folkestone and Hythe District
 Folkestone and Hythe (UK Parliament constituency)